Michel Viaud (15 February 1940 – 10 May 2001) was a French rower. He competed at the 1960 Summer Olympics in Rome with the men's eight where they came fourth.

References

1940 births
2001 deaths
French male rowers
Olympic rowers of France
Rowers at the 1960 Summer Olympics
Sportspeople from Nantes
World Rowing Championships medalists for France
Rowers at the 1964 Summer Olympics
European Rowing Championships medalists
20th-century French people